Patvi Namdar Maharajkumar Shri Udaybhansinhji Natwarsinhji Jethwa Sahib (6 October 1901 in Shrinagar, Gujarat – 1977 in Bombay), was the last Maharajkumar or Yuvraj of Jethwa dynasty of Princely State of Porbandar. He was associated with cooperative movement in post-independent India and was recipient of Padma Shri.

Birth
He was born at Shrinagar, a town within the erstwhile Porbandar State of Gujarat on 6 October 1901 to Rana Shri Shivsinhji Motiji Sahib Jethwa, a distant cousin of Maharaja Rana Sahib Natwarsinhji Bhavsinhji Jethwa, the ruling scion of Princely State of Porbanadar.

Education
After having done his primary education in Shrinagar & Porbandar he studied at Girassia College at Wadhwan. Afterwards, he earned B.A. degree from Bombay University and lastly studied Government Agriculture College at Poona and in 1932 passed out with Bachelor of Agriculture (B.Ag.) Degree.

Adoption and marriage
As, Rana Sahib Natwarsinhji Bhavsinhji had no male issue, he adopted Udaysinhji, as a son and heir-apparent to the throne of Porbandar on 12 June 1941. In the same year, on 3 July 1941; Udaysinhji was married to Maharajkumari Shri Prem Kunverba Sahiba, daughter of H.H. Thakore Sahib Shri Digvijaysinhji Daulatsinhji Sahib of Limbdi. The couple did not have any issues from marriage.

Career
He started his career as Preventive Officer at Bombay Port Trust and Customs Department. Later he was acclaimed as a leader of cooperative movement in India He was the founder and first Chairman of Indian Farmers Fertilizers Cooperative Organization (IFFCO), which has emerged as the world’s largest fertilizers company. He served as Chairman of Indian Farmers Fertiliser Cooperative Limited (IFFCO) from years 1968-1973.

Memorials
The National Council of Cooperative Training (NCCT) started Udaybhansinhji Regional Institute of Co-operative Management (URICM), named after Udaybhansinhji Natwarsinhji Jethwa in 1956 at Bhavnagar, now shifted to Gandhinagar, Gujarat.

Padma Shri
He was awarded Padma Shri award by Government of India in year 1971, in field of Trade & Industry from the State of Gujarat as a recognition to his contribution in this field, especially for his contributions related to cooperative movement, agriculture trade and industry.

Death
He died in 1977, in Bombay, without issue. When he died, the Rana Sahib Natwarsinhji Bhavsinhji, the last Maharaja of Porbandar, was still alive; he died in 1979 but he did not decide upon the next heir to the throne before his death. This has left the headship of Jethwa dynasty of Porbandar uncertain, even after more than three decades.

References

Recipients of the Padma Shri in trade and industry
1901 births
1977 deaths
Maharajas of Porbandar
Hindu monarchs
Indian royalty
University of Mumbai alumni